Upolampes is a monotypic genus of butterfly in the family Lycaenidae. Its single species, Upolampes evena, is found in New Guinea, from Western New Guinea to Papua New Guinea and Karkar Island (Australasian realm).

External links

"Upolampes Bethune-Baker, 1908" at Markku Savela's Lepidoptera and Some Other Life Forms

Polyommatini
Monotypic butterfly genera
Lycaenidae genera